Shaw College may refer to:

Shaw College (Hong Kong), a part of the Chinese University of Hong Kong
Shaw College of Detroit, a former college in Detroit
Shaw College, a former name of Rust College, Holly Springs, Mississippi

See also
Shaw University, Raleigh, NC, USA
Shaw (disambiguation)